Niina Sarias (born 20 August 1984) is a Finnish snowboarder. She competed in the women's parallel giant slalom event at the 2006 Winter Olympics.

References

1984 births
Living people
Finnish female snowboarders
Olympic snowboarders of Finland
Snowboarders at the 2006 Winter Olympics
Sportspeople from Oulu